Antoni Zdanowski (1895–1948) was a Polish social and union activist, and also an editor of Robotniczy Przegląd Gospodarczy.

In 1917 he became a member of Polish Socialist Party in Russia. 

During 1919–1920 he was a secretary of Central Commission of Trade Unions and from 1925–1939 he served as its vice-general secretary. In 1921, he co-founded the Warsaw Housing Cooperative. 

During World War II Zdanowski was a member of Polish Socialist Party - Liberty Equality Independence and in the years of 1940–1945 manager of its Central Party Administration. 

He and his wife, Janina Pajdak, were arrested in 1947 by the by Office of Security. She died that same year in prison. He died the following year (1948) in prison.

References
 
 

1895 births
1948 deaths
Polish cooperative organizers
Polish trade unionists
Polish editors
Polish Socialist Party politicians
Prisoners who died in Polish People's Republic detention